Thomas Andrew Zlaket (born May 30, 1941) is an American lawyer and jurist who served as a justice of the Arizona Supreme Court from 1992 to 2002 and as the chief justice of the court from 1997 to 2002.

Education 
Zlaket received his bachelor's degree from University of Notre Dame in 1962, his LL.B. from University of Arizona in 1965 and an LL.M. in Judicial Process from University of Virginia in 2002.

Career 
He was president of the Arizona State Bar in 1988 and 1989. For 27 years, Zlaket practiced law in Tucson for several firms, including with his brother, Eugene, for Zlaket & Zlaket. He was also a judge pro-tem at Pima County Superior Court.

Zlaket was widely praised for his struggle to make the court system accessible.

After leaving the bench, Zlaket returned to private practice and later served as an Adjunct Assistant Professor at the University of Arizona. As of 2018 he is no longer a professor at the university.

References

External links
 Zlaket Law Offices

1941 births
Living people
20th-century American judges
20th-century American lawyers
21st-century American judges
21st-century American lawyers
Arizona lawyers
California lawyers
Chief Justices of the Arizona Supreme Court
James E. Rogers College of Law alumni
Justices of the Arizona Supreme Court
People from Ontario, California
People from San Diego
University of Notre Dame alumni
University of Virginia School of Law alumni